X woman or variations thereof may refer to:

 A female student of St. Francis Xavier University
 St. Francis Xavier University X-Women
 St. Francis Xavier X-Women
 X Women (original title: X Femmes), a French television series of short films from 2008–2009 on Canal+
 X-Women, female members of the X-Men
X-Women (Manara), a comic book from 2009 by Milo Manara and Chris Claremont
X-Women: The Sinister Virus, a 1997 video game for the Sega Genesis 
 Woman X, a name given to the first Denisovan discovered